

List

References

Y